Summer 2019 is a European tour by Australian recording artist Kylie Minogue, in support of her fourth major greatest hits album, Step Back in Time: The Definitive Collection (2019). The tour commenced on 20 June 2019 in Kingston upon Thames, England at the Hampton Court Palace, and ended at the Latin American Memorial in São Paulo in 7 March 2020.

Background 
The tour was first announced on 12 November 2018, during the European leg of her Golden Tour, with Minogue posting a photo of the dates on her social media sites. Over the course of the following months, a further eight dates were added to the tour, including her performance at the 'legend slot' at Glastonbury Festival 2019.

Critical reception 
For the opening night of the tour in Hampton Court Palace, Thomas Hobbs from the Evening Standard gave the show four stars out of five, calling the show "the perfect warm-up for her Sunday evening legends slot", stating that Minogue was "unapologetically cheesy" but "so endearing". He also picked out the mashup of "Slow" and Bowie's "Fashion" as a highlight of the show.

Laura Snapes from The Guardian gave the Glastonbury show a five-star review, complimenting Minogue on managing a "seemingly impossible combination of sincerity and camp, pop perfection and pure emotion". She went on to applaud her set list and showmanship as "absolutely phenomenal" and concluded saying, "Never mind the legends slot; next stop, headliner." Dan Stubbs from NME praised the show for being "subtly subversive" and concluded that her Glastonbury debut was "worth the wait". Similarly, Anna Leszkiewicz from The Independent gave the show a positive review. Leszkiewicz praised that Minogue "has never been one to shy away from her brand of school disco pop", yet criticised that she sometimes "veered into self-parody" during the show. Minogue's performance was the most watched Glastonbury performance in history, peaking with 3.9 million viewers.

Setlist 
This set list is representative of the 23 June 2019 show in Blenheim. It does not represent all dates of the tour.

 "Love at First Sight"
 "I Should Be So Lucky"
 "On a Night Like This"
 "Get Outta My Way"
 "What Do I Have to Do"
 "Never Too Late"
"Je ne sais pas pourquoi"
 "Hand on Your Heart"
 "In Your Eyes"
 "The One"'
"Slow" 
 "Confide in Me" 
 "Kids"
 "Can't Get You Out of My Head" 
"Especially for You"
 "Shocked"
 "Step Back in Time"
 "Better the Devil You Know"
 "The Loco-Motion" 
 "All the Lovers"
Encore
"Dancing"
 "Spinning Around"

Notes

 On opening night, "Spinning Around" was performed before "Dancing", but the songs were swapped thereafter.
 At the Glastonbury Festival show, "Get Outta My Way", "What Do I Have to Do", "Never Too Late", "In Your Eyes" and "The One" were not performed. Minogue performed "Where the Wild Roses Grow" with Nick Cave after "Hand on Your Heart", and was joined by Coldplay lead singer Chris Martin to perform "Can't Get You Out of My Head".
At the Brighton Pride performance, Minogue added "Your Disco Needs You" before "All the Lovers".
At the Dubai performance, Minogue added "Wow" to the setlist, replacing "I Should Be So Lucky", while "What Do I Have to Do", "Never Too Late" and "Je ne sais pas pourquoi" were also not performed. "Get Outta My Way" was moved to where "Je ne sais pas pourquoi" was originally performed in the set. "Especially for You" was also moved, being performed after "The Loco-Motion", with "Shocked" opening the fourth act instead. Additionally, the "Can't Get You Out Of My Head" performance was altered, with the acoustic version being dropped in favor of an arrangement closer to the original version.
 The São Paulo show followed the same structure as Dubai, with some changes. Minogue performed "In My Arms" right after "On A Night Like This", as a nod to the KylieX2008 show in the same city. Additionally, snippets of both "Your Disco Needs You" and "Come Into My World" were performed impromptu due to fans requesting them while "Especially for You" was dropped from the setlist.

Shows

Notes

References

2019 concert tours
2020 concert tours
Kylie Minogue concert tours